Morgan Tsvangirai, leader of the Movement for Democratic Change - Tsvangirai, announced his party's shadow cabinet on 18 September 2013. It is the first time since 2009 that MDC-T formed a cabinet in opposition, as it had been part of a government of national unity with the ZANU-PF from that time until the end of the coalition in 2013.

List
 Morgan Tsvangirai - Leader of the Opposition
 Gordon Moyo - International Relations and Cooperation 
 Thamsanqa Mahlangu - Tourism, Environment and Natural Resources 
 Tendai Biti - Finance and Economic Development 
 Gift Chimanikire - Defence 
 Ruth Labode - Health and Child Welfare 
 Concilia Chinanzvavana - Basic Education 
 Dr Peter Matarutse - Higher Education Science and Technology 
 Sesel Zvidzai - Local Government 
 Elias Mudzuri - Transport 
 Nelson Chamisa - Communications 
 Abednico Bhebhe - Mines and Minerals Development 
 Sen. Morgan Komichi - Energy and Power Development
 Sipepa Nkomo - Agriculture, Land and Water Development
 Jessie Majome - Justice Legal and Parliamentary Affairs 
 Sen. Lilian Timveos - Home Affairs 
 Tapiwa Mashakada - Industry and Commerce Hon 
 Paurina Mpariwa - Labour, Employment and Social Security 
 Lucia Matibenga - Women's Affairs, Gender and Community Development 
 Solomon Madzore - Youth, Sport, Arts & Culture 
 Joel Gabuza - Public Works and National Housing

Planning Commission
In addition, Tsvangirai formed a five-member "planning commission" of non-parliamentary party advisors:
 Jameson Timba
 Theresa Makone
 Douglas Mwonzora
 Tongai Matutu
 Elton Mangoma

References

Movement for Democratic Change